Bytom railway station is a station in Bytom, Silesian Voivodeship, Poland. It is the main railway station for Bytom, located by Wolski Square. One of the few in Poland with a platform hall.

History

The modern-day building is located on the grounds of Bytom's former, historic railway station, built in 1868. The former railway station was built together with the construction of the Tarnowskie Góry - Katowice - Czechowice-Dziedzice. After World War I, and the division of Silesia, the station's significance increased. In 1929–30, the two oldest buildings from 1872 and 1900 were demolished, and replaced by a new railway station building with a platform hall, in the place of the former round engine house from 1872 and a depot for the transit of cargo  from wagons on narrow-gauge railway and normal track gauge. Platforms 2,3 and 4 operated German routes, whilst platform 1 operated Polish routes.

The railway station remains in its modernist architectural form.

Connections 

131 Chorzów Batory - Tczew
132 Bytom - Wrocław Główny
710 Bytom - Bytom Borek

References 

Buildings and structures in Bytom
Railway stations in Silesian Voivodeship
Railway stations in Poland opened in 1868